An eup or ŭp is an administrative unit in both North Korea and South Korea similar to the unit of town.

In South Korea

Along with "myeon", an "eup" is one of the divisions of a county ("gun"), and of some cities ("si") with a population of less than 500,000.  The main town or towns in a county—or the secondary town or towns within a city's territory—are designated as "eup"s. Towns are subdivided into villages ("ri"). In order to form an eup, the minimum population required is 20,000.

See also
Administrative divisions of North Korea
Administrative divisions of South Korea

Notes

Up
Subdivisions of South Korea